Ghinnir Airport , also known as Ginir Airport, is an airport serving Ghinnir, Ethiopia.

See also

List of airports in Ethiopia

References

External links
Aircraft Charter WorldAirports in Ethiopia 

Airports in Ethiopia
Oromia Region